Olly Robinson (born 21 July 1991) is an English rugby union player who plays as a flanker for Cardiff Rugby in the URC.

Career
Robinson was first noticed by Bristol Rugby after putting in sequentially impressive performances while plying his trade for Moseley, and was snapped up by his father, then Bristol Director Of Rugby, Andy Robinson in the summer of 2014. Robinson got his chance at top-flight rugby in the Aviva Premiership, after helping Bristol to promotion. Robinson also captained Bristol at times during this period. After Bristol's relegation back to the Greene King IPA Championship Robinson went on loan to Pro14 outfit Cardiff Rugby, returning from his loan spell to play one final time for Bristol. It was announced, firstly, that Robinson was to make a permanent switch to Cardiff from the end of the 2017/18 season; and then a few days later, that this arrangement came into immediate effect.

On 18 January 2022 it was announced that Leicester Tigers had agreed to take Robinson on loan for the remainder of the 2021/22 season, Robinson played 7 times for Leicester in his loan spell.

References

External links 
Cardiff Rugby profile

1991 births
Living people
Rugby union players from Bristol
English rugby union players
Cardiff Rugby players
Rugby union flankers
Bristol Bears players
Leicester Tigers players